The European Federation for Hunting and Conservation (FACE) is a pro-hunting lobbying group based in Brussels. Established in 1977, FACE is a non-profit nongovernmental organisation. FACE is made up of national hunters’ associations from 37 European countries, including all the 27 EU member states, and is supported by 7 associate members.

References

External links
European Federation for Hunting and Conservation
FACE in the EU Transparency Register

Hunting organizations
International organisations based in Belgium
Organizations established in 1977